The fall of Philadelphia marked the conquest of Philadelphia, the last independent Christian Greek settlement in western Asia Minor, to the Muslim Ottomans of the Ottoman Empire. Ironically, the besieging army included a contingent from the Byzantine Empire, which had become an Ottoman vassal state.

After the capture of Nicomedia by the Ottomans in 1337, the city of Philadelphia was the last city in Asia Minor that remained controlled by Christians and Romans for several decades. Prior to its fall, the city had evaded the fate of other Greek cities by its remote location up in the Lydian hills, its strong fortifications and its paying of tribute to the numerous fanatical Muslim ghazis, whose bands robbed and pillaged any Christians in Anatolia who did not pay protection money (jizya). Although the city was not officially under Islamic law and was in theory under the Byzantine Empire, it was away from the sea and in the middle of a vast, hostile Ottoman-occupied territory, which made it virtually independent and, at the time of its capture, more under the influence of the state of the Knights of Rhodes.

In the Byzantine civil war of 1376-1379, the Ottomans helped Byzantine Emperor John V Palaiologos regain his throne. However, Byzantium was now a vassal state under the Ottomans and John V's son Manuel (later Emperor Manuel II Palaiologos) was sent as an honorary hostage to the court of the Ottoman Sultan Bayezid I at Prousa. During that period, Manuel was forced to witness and even to participate in the destruction of many Greek cities by the Ottomans.

In 1378, Manuel II Palaiologos promised to hand over the city of Philadelphia to the Ottomans in return for the Ottoman sultan's aid in a disastrous Byzantine civil war. However, Manuel seems to have retracted his promise since it was not until 1390 that Bayezid summoned the two leaders of the civil war, John VII and Manuel II, and ordered them to accompany the besieging force. Apparently, the Philadelphians ignored that arrangement and refused surrender.

Battle
In 1390, Sultan Bayezid summoned the co-emperors of Byzantium, John VII and Manuel II and ordered them to accompany the besieging Turkish force to Philadelphia.
The co-emperors submitted to the degradation, and Philadelphia surrendered when it saw the imperial banner hoisted among the horse-tails of the Turkish pashas above the camp of the besiegers. The humiliation of the empire could go no further than when the heir of Justinian and Basil Bulgaroktonos took the field at the behest of a Turkish Emir, in order to extinguish the last relics of freedom in his own country.
Philadelphia
Philadelphia
14th-century conflicts
14th century in the Byzantine Empire
Philadelphia
History of Manisa Province
1380s in the Byzantine Empire
1390s in the Byzantine Empire
1380s in the Ottoman Empire
1390s in the Ottoman Empire
1370s in the Byzantine Empire
1378 in the Ottoman Empire
1390 in the Ottoman Empire
Alaşehir